Yang Shande (1873 – August 13, 1919) was a Chinese politician of the late Qing Dynasty and early Republican period. He supported Yuan Shikai's restoration of the monarchy and was made a count under the Empire of China (1915–1916).

1873 births
1919 deaths
Qing dynasty politicians from Anhui
Republic of China politicians from Anhui
People from Huaining County
Empire of China (1915–1916)
Politicians from Anqing